This is a list of characters in the 1964 Roald Dahl book Charlie and the Chocolate Factory, his 1972 sequel Charlie and the Great Glass Elevator, and the former's film adaptations, Willy Wonka & the Chocolate Factory (1971) and Charlie and the Chocolate Factory (2005). Listings include actors who have played the characters in various media.

Main characters

Willy Wonka

In the novels and films, Willy Wonka is the eccentric owner of the world's largest candy factory, making candy and chocolate. Wonka holds a contest, hiding 5 Golden Tickets within the wrappers of his chocolate bars, promising their finders a tour of his factory and a lifelong supply of his creations.

Wonka has a black goatee and "marvelously" bright eyes, a high and "flutey" voice, a face "alight of fun and laughter", and quick little jerky movements "like a squirrel". He is enthusiastic, talkative, friendly and charming, but is sometimes insensitive and has been given to glossing self-criticism.

In the 1971 film Willy Wonka & the Chocolate Factory, he is portrayed by Gene Wilder. While his personality remains generally the same as in the original, he is more melancholy here, and frequently quotes books and poems, including William Shakespeare's Romeo and Juliet ("Is it my soul that calls upon my name?") or John Masefield's "Sea-Fever" ("All I ask is a tall ship and a star to steer her by"), and the famous "Candy is dandy, but liquor is quicker" from "Reflections on Ice-Breaking" by Ogden Nash, among many others. Toward the end of the film, he tests Charlie's conscience by reprimanding him and pretending to deny him any reward but assumes an almost paternal role when Charlie proves to be honest after all.

In the 2005 film Charlie and the Chocolate Factory, he is portrayed by Johnny Depp. In this version, a backstory was added which reveals his troubled upbringing: Willy Wonka's father (being a dentist) would not let him eat sweets because of the potential risk to his teeth, and the young Wonka left home to travel to Switzerland and Bavaria and become a chocolatier. At the end of the film, Wonka reconciles with his father, who is revealed to have collected newspaper clippings of his son's success.

Charlie Bucket

Charlie Bucket is the second main character of Charlie and the Chocolate Factory, its sequel Charlie and the Great Glass Elevator, and the film adaptations of these books. Dahl's widow said that Charlie was originally intended to be black. He is depicted as a kind-hearted and selfless boy who lives with his mother, father and his four grandparents. In the original film, he has a newspaper route after school. He and his family follow the progress of the hunt for the Golden Tickets in newspapers and television. Unlike the first four finalists, Charlie is honest and generous; he is actually worried if the other nasty children such as Augustus and Veruca will actually be alive after their ordeals. This positive depiction of an honest caring young boy contradicted how Dahl negative portrayed Oompa-Loompas as a racist stereotype of imported African slaves. In the 1971 film, Charlie was portrayed by Peter Ostrum, in his only film appearance. His nationality is never explicitly stated, but in the 1971 film, he speaks with an American accent, and in the 2005 film, he speaks with an English accent. The filmmakers have stated that it was their intention that Charlie's hometown be kept ambiguous. In this version, when Grandpa Joe decides to accompany Charlie to the factory, Charlie explains that the family needs the money now, instead of the ticket; then Grandpa George explains why Charlie still has to go to the factory, and indeed he and Grandpa Joe do go.

In the novel, at the end of the tour, Wonka declares Charlie the heir to the factory for his refusal of vice, and Charlie's family are permitted to move into the factory. In the 1971 film, Charlie wins the factory when he returns an Everlasting Gobstopper given to him by Wonka, thereby passing Wonka's moral test. In the 2005 film, Wonka initially refuses to allow Charlie's family to join them in the factory, whereupon Charlie rejects Wonka's offer. When Charlie helps Wonka reconcile with his father, the family move into the factory, and Charlie and Wonka become partners.

Grandpa Joe

Grandpa Joe is one of Charlie's four bed-ridden grandparents. He tells Charlie (and the reader) the story of Willy Wonka's chocolate factory and the mystery of the secret workers. When Charlie finds the Golden Ticket, Grandpa Joe leaps out of bed in joy and is chosen as the one to accompany Charlie in the tour of the factory. In the sequel book, he and all members of Charlie's family ride with Charlie and Wonka in the Great Glass Elevator and assists the rescue of the Commuter Capsule from the Vermicious Knids. Grandpa Joe's age is given as "ninety-six and a half" in Charlie and the Chocolate Factory, making him the eldest of Charlie's grandparents, but in the musical, it is stated he is almost ninety and a half.
 
The character was played by Jack Albertson in the 1971 film adaptation Willy Wonka & the Chocolate Factory. In this film, he is often excitable, paranoid, and stubborn, and appears anxious that Charlie won the contest, and becomes angry when Charlie is dismissed without reward because they had violated the rules by stealing Fizzy Lifting Drinks and not following the tour, which indicated that Charlie violated the contract, before realizing that returning the everlasting gobstopper was the true test.
 
The character was played by David Kelly in the 2005 film adaptation, Charlie and the Chocolate Factory. Veteran actor Gregory Peck was originally selected to play the role, but he died in 2003 before filming began. This version of the character is written as more calm than the 1971 version. An original backstory to Grandpa Joe's past was added to Tim Burton's film, wherein it is said that Joe worked for Wonka until the latter fired all his workers from his factory due to constant corporate espionage by rival confectionery manufacturers. When he returns to the factory with Charlie for the tour and stated that he used to work for him, Wonka asks if he was one of the spies working for one of his rivals. Joe assures he wasn't and Wonka welcomes him back.

While Grandpa Joe's character was portrayed sympathetically, he (particularly the 1971 film representation) later became the subject of heavy internet parody, especially for his eagerness to accompany Charlie despite having been bedridden and not contributing to the family financially.

Other golden ticket winners

Augustus Gloop
Augustus Gloop is an obese, greedy, 9-year-old boy, the first person to find a Golden Ticket and one of the four main antagonists of Charlie and the Chocolate Factory. He hails from the fictional town of Dusselheim, Germany in the 1971 film, and Düsseldorf, Germany in the 2005 film. His mother takes great pride in his gluttonous eating and seems to enjoy the attention of the media. In the novel and both films, he is portrayed as "enormously fat". Augustus is the first to be removed from the tour: while drinking from the Chocolate Room's Chocolate River, he accidentally falls into the river and is drawn through a pipe to the factory's Fudge Room. His parents are summoned to retrieve him from the mixing-machine. In the book, he is depicted leaving the factory extremely underweight from being squeezed in the pipe.

In the 1971 film, despite eating constantly, he is not as obese as he is in the book and has decent table manners. Although he appears uninterested in Charlie and the other three finalists due to his only aspiration being that of eating, he is seen as being polite to them. When Augustus falls into the chocolate river, Charlie tries to rescue him using a giant lollipop. He is portrayed by Michael Böllner in this film. Since Böllner could not speak fluent English at the time of the film's production, the 1971 Augustus has fewer lines and less screen time.

In the 2005 film, Augustus is always shown consuming chocolate. He has a binge eating disorder and often has food smeared on his face, additionally, his obesity is far more severe than the 1971 portrayal, causing him to have a slower, lumbering walk relative to the other children. He is a bully towards Charlie in the one instance when they interact, as Augustus offers Charlie a bite of his Wonka Bar and then retracts it, saying that Charlie should have brought some himself. As in the book, he is shown leaving the factory underweight toward the end of the story; but in this version, he is his normal size, licking his fingers to remove the adherent chocolate that he is still coated in, to which his mother begs him to stop, but Augustus refuses, saying that he tastes "so good". The actor, Philip Wiegratz, wore a fatsuit for the production.

In the book, both of Augustus's parents accompany him to the factory. Both film versions contradict this, however, and only his mother goes with him.

In the 2013 London musical, Augustus Gloop is known as "the Bavarian Beefcake" in his Alpine community. His mother and father indulge his eating habits with sweets and pieces of sausage of which they (and sometimes Augustus) butcher themselves. In his number, "More of Him to Love", Frau Gloop reveals that she had vital organs removed to retrieve Augustus from the womb. They arrive at the factory wearing traditional Eastern European clothing, with Augustus in a red, argyle sweater and green shorts. When Augustus falls into the Chocolate River, Wonka summons the diversionary pumping system to divert the flow, while Oompa-Loompas dressed in red boiler suits sing, "Auf Wiedersehen, Augustus Gloop", as they prepare the chocolate, while Augustus travels through the main industrial pipe, occasionally getting stuck in it. The 2017 Broadway rendition of the musical does not largely alter the character, though he and all the other finalists (sans Charlie) are portrayed by adults. Further, Augustus's father is confirmed to be deceased; it is implied that Augustus actually devoured him.

Veruca Salt

Veruca Salt is a greedy, demanding, spoiled brat and one of the four main antagonists of Charlie and the Chocolate Factory. She demands every single thing she requests and is the second person to find a Golden Ticket and the third eliminated from the tour. Unlike the other children, she did not find the golden ticket herself; her father instructed the workers of his peanut shelling factory to unwrap thousands of Wonka bars he had purchased until they found a golden ticket.

Showing her wealthy parents no mercy and no regard for other people's property, Veruca frequently pesters them to purchase a variety of different things for her; when the tour reaches the Nut Room — a room where trained squirrels test each nut to see if it is good or bad by tapping it with their knuckles — Veruca demands that her parents buy one for her. Wonka refuses, so she goes in and gets one for herself. The squirrels grab her and declare her a "bad nut". After that, both she and her parents are thrown down the garbage chute; all three Salts are seen exiting the factory "covered in garbage".

In the 1971 film adaptation, Veruca has a fiery temper, rudely demands various desires nonstop, brags about her wealth, and chastises anyone who questions her. In this film, it is not squirrels but geese that lay special golden chocolate-filled eggs for Easter, one of which she demands as a new pet. She and Violet bicker on two occasions. Veruca is eliminated at the end of her musical number in the film ("I Want it Now") after climbing a machine designed to tell whether or not the goose eggs are "good" or "bad" eggs. The machine judges her as a "bad egg" and she disappears down the garbage chute. Her father is judged the same and follows suit.

In the 2005 film adaptation, Veruca's elimination remains nearly the same as in the book and the Tom and Jerry version, with only a few changes made. Her demeanour is less vehement, but more obnoxious, compared to the 1971 version. In the 2005 film, it is revealed that she owns a pony, two dogs, four cats, six rabbits, two parakeets, three canaries, a parrot, a turtle, and a hamster, totalling up to 21 pets. However, the pony is not mentioned in the original book. But when she interferes with the trained squirrels used by Willy Wonka to select the best nuts to bake into chocolate bars, she is judged as a "bad nut" by the squirrels and discarded into the adjacent garbage chute and her dad, being with her, follows suit. Both are later seen leaving the factory covered in garbage, with Veruca's father trying with extraordinary effort to contain his visible anger against her. When she sees the Great Glass Elevator, she demands one like it; however, instead of cheerfully catering to Veruca's demands like before, as he had been reformed by the Oompa-Loompas (whom he felt had taught him a good parenting lesson), Veruca's father tells her sternly and firmly that the only thing she will be getting that day "is a bath, and that’s final". Not only has his opinion of Veruca changed, but he also changes his ways of disciplining her, having realized how much he and his wife have spoilt Veruca. When she speaks up, he fiercely glares at her, prompting her to be quiet.

Her nationality was never specified in Dahl's novel, but she hails from an upper-class family in the United Kingdom in both films – in the 2005 film, she lives in Buckinghamshire. In the book, both of Veruca's parents accompany her to the factory. Both film versions contradict this, however, and have only her father go with her.

In the 2013 Sam Mendes London musical, Veruca Salt is a British billionaire's daughter, dressed in a pink ballerina tutu and baby seal fur coat – "clubbed and tickled pink". Her father, Sir Robert Salt, is portrayed as a spineless dolt for giving his daughter her wishes. In the Nut Sorting Room, Veruca runs foul of the nut-testing squirrels who deem her a 'bad nut' when she tries to steal one of them. This summons oversized squirrels with Oompa-Loompas riding on their backs. They sing a nightmarish ballet, "Veruca's Nutcracker Sweet", that concludes with Veruca and her father sent down the garbage chute; it has similar lyrics to the original book – although in the book version, both of Veruca parents follow her down the garbage chute. In the Broadway version, Veruca's nationality is changed to Russian, and the squirrels tear her apart limb by limb, but Wonka assures the group that the Ooompa-Loompas will be able to put her back together again.

In the Tom and Jerry version of the 1971 film, Veruca's role is the same. Veruca and her father along with Jerry and Tuffy manage to escape the furnace right before it ignites while trapping Tom inside. Veruca demands her father to take her home and buy her a chocolate factory of her own. Having had enough of Veruca's spoiled and selfish behaviour, Mr. Salt finally decides to discipline her as the near-death experience that they have both gone through seems to have finally gotten to him while stating that she is lucky that they weren't incinerated. 

in 2022 to  2023 in the New Adventures of Maya the bee and willy. veruca is  exterminator's niece 

in 2023 in original movie Tom and Jerry: happy feet. veruca  makes his Appearance along with his father to capturing the penguins of emperor land and adelie land and put him on veruca and his father's favorite zoo. his name is Salt's zoo. and end  she's and his father  just getting arrested

Violet Beauregarde

Violet Beauregarde is a skillful, self-centered, rude, and chewing gum-obsessed girl, the third person to find a Golden Ticket, one of the four main antagonists of Charlie and the Chocolate Factory, and the second to be eliminated from the tour. Violet chews gum obsessively and boasts that she has been chewing the same piece "for three months solid", a world record which Violet proclaims was previously held by her best friend Cornelia Prinzmetel. She is also aggressively competitive and prideful and has won trophies for gum chewing and other activities. She has brown hair in the 1971 film, while in the 2005 film, she has blonde hair. In the 1971 film, she is shown to be from Miles City, Montana, while in the 2005 film, she is from Atlanta, Georgia.

When Wonka shows the group around the Inventing Room, he stops to display a new type of gum he is working on. The gum doubles as a three-course meal which is composed of tomato soup, roast beef and baked potato, and blueberry pie and ice cream. Violet is intrigued and eager to try it out, despite Wonka's protests, snatches and chews the gum. She is delighted by its effects but, when she reaches the dessert, blueberry pie, her skin starts turning a somewhat indigo color and her body begins to swell up, filling with blueberry juice. Eventually, Violet's head, legs, and arms get sucked into her gigantic body, but she is still mobile and is able to waddle. When her swelling stops, she resembles a blueberry, causing Wonka to have the Oompa-Loompas roll her to the Juicing Room to have the juice squeezed out of her. She is last seen leaving the factory with the other children, restored to her normal size and becomes more flexible, but her indigo skin remains, and is most likely permanent as Wonka says there is nothing that can be done to change Violet's skin back to its original pigment.

In the 1971 film, 12-year-old Violet is impatient, arrogant, self-centred, vain, and impulsive; however, she is also polite to everyone, with the exception of Veruca Salt, with whom she persistently argues. She is accompanied by her father, Sam Beauregarde, a fast-talking car salesman and politician who tries to advertise his business during Violet's television interview. She demeans Cornelia Prinzmetel more than she did in the book. Her blueberry form is relatively small, and her hair color remains unchanged. Violet is informed that she must be juiced immediately before she explodes and is last seen en route to the Juicing Room, and her father follows after, crying, "I've got a blueberry for a daughter!"

In the 2005 film, 10-year old Violet is described as being "brash, rude and insanely competitive". Aside from gum-chewing, she also has many other interests that reflect her obsession with always winning, such as in karate. She is accompanied by her single mother, Scarlett Beauregarde (a former baton champion herself), whose own competitive personality appears to have had an influence on her daughter, as Scarlett expresses pride over Violet's 263 trophies and medals. Cornelia Prinzmetel was not mentioned in this film. In this version, when she and Veruca interact with each other, they suggest being best friends, though they do not really like each other. Violet is also shown to be anti-social and bullying when she briefly insults Charlie, snatching a piece of confectionery from his hand and calling him a loser when he tries to interact with her. She turns blue, although her lips remain red, her eyes and hair turn blue, and swells up into a 10-foot blueberry before being rolled off to the Juicing Room by the Oompa-Loompas to squeeze the juice out of her body. Violet is shown leaving the factory gymnastically cartwheeling as a consequence of her increased flexibility, which she is actually happy about, although her mother is less than pleased with her daughter's possibly permanently indigo colour.

In the 2013 Sam Mendes London musical, Violet Beauregarde is portrayed as an African-American, Californian fame-hungry wannabe, with her agent/father Eugene Beauregarde parlaying her mundane talent of gum chewing into celebrity status, with multitude of endorsements including her own TV show, line of perfume, and a clothing boutique franchise. Her theme is called "The Double-Bubble Duchess". It is revealed that Violet's chewing "skill" was picked up when she was a baby and her mother tried to get her to stop talking all the time. Violet and her father are escorted by an entourage to the factory entrance. Violet comes dressed in a sparkly purple and pink disco jumper and a pink backpack. Upon swelling in the influence of the experimental gum (which consisted of tomato soup, roast chicken, potatoes and gravy, Fizzy Orange, cheese and crackers and blueberry pie), she panics and runs away as the Oompa-Loompas break into a disco number, "Juicy", and roller skate along the stage as Violet lifts into the air, resembling a giant purple disco ball. Mr. Beauregarde phones his lawyer excitedly, with intent to profit from Violet's new size, until Violet explodes. Wonka's only reassurance of her survival is the prospect of rescuing the pieces and de-juicing them. In the Broadway version, the song "Juicy" is cut out (the only child-exit song to be cut from the London version), and Violet instead becomes a blueberry and explodes in the background when an Oompa-Loompa blows an air-dart at her while Wonka explains how he met the Ooompa-Loompas to the group.

Mike Teavee

Mike Teavee is a 9-year-old boy who does nothing but watch television, both the fourth Golden Ticket finder and the fourth to be eliminated from the tour, and one of the four main antagonists of Charlie and the Chocolate Factory. He was described as adorned with 18 toy pistols that he "fires" while watching gangsters on TV. He is bad-tempered and slothful, but also intelligent. How he found his Golden Ticket is never explained in the book or 1971 film, as he is too absorbed in his television viewing to talk to the press about it. In the 2005 film, he does have an explanation on how he found the Golden Ticket: he used an algorithm to find it as an intellectual exercise. In the book, both of Mike's parents tour the factory with him. During a display of miniaturisation technology, used to transport chocolate, Mike shrinks himself to a tiny size, Willy Wonka has an Oompa-Loompa take the Teavee family to the Gum-Stretcher Room to get Mike stretched back to normal. His last name resembles the word TV in connection to his love of electronics.

In the 1971 film, Mike is played by Paris Themmen and his surname is spelled "Teevee" in the credits. Mike is nine years old and accompanied to the factory by his high-strung mother. He is from the fictional town of Marble Falls, Arizona, enjoys Western films and wears cowboy attire. He makes constant references to television shows throughout the factory tour and comes across as somewhat of a know-it-all. Although easily annoyed, he does not have any major anger issues and gets along relatively well with the other kids.

In the 2005 film, 13-year-old Mike is portrayed by Jordan Fry, and his interests are updated to being very destructive, with the Internet and video games (especially gory first-person shooters), in addition to television viewing. In this version, he is from Denver, Colorado, is accompanied by his father, and is portrayed as more disrespectful and violent. In the Chocolate Room, when Wonka told everyone to enjoy his candy, he did not eat anything, instead he was stomping on a candy pumpkin, completely destroying it in the process, and when Mr. Teavee told him to stop, he ignores him with a brief sentence: "Dad, he said 'enjoy'!" Also, whenever he says something critical of Wonka's company, or his ideas, Wonka reacts as if Mike is mumbling, even though he does not. He is able to find the Golden Ticket by using math and logic, though he admits that he does not even like chocolate. When Mike demands to know why candy is pointless, Charlie tries to reason with him, saying candy does not have to have a point, then he exclaims that candy is a waste of time (like Wonka's father), but then Wonka's flashback reappears again. When they arrive in the Television Chocolate Room, Mike points that Wonka could use his teleportation device to revolutionise mankind, as opposed to distributing his products, ignoring the fact that anything sent by television gets shrunk. When Mr. Teavee tries to reason with his son, the boy insults Wonka and sends himself by television. After the incident in the Television Chocolate Room, Willy Wonka has an Oompa-Loompa take Mr. Teavee and Mike to the Taffy-Puller Room to have Mike stretched back to normal.

In the 2013 Sam Mendes London musical, Mike Teavee (now age 10) lives in a suburban neighbourhood with his disinterested father Norman Teavee and neurotic, alcoholic mother, Doris Teavee; in this version, he is wearing a black shirt with an orange jacket on the outside. Their opening number, "It's Teavee Time!" has Mrs. Teavee presenting her family as a normal, functioning household, downplaying Mike's violent tendencies like setting a cat on fire, chloroforming a nurse, and stealing a German tank. In the Department of the Future, where Wonka transmits chocolate by television, Mike jumps into the machine and transmits himself, much to his mother's horror. Wonka summons the monitors to see on which channel Mike has ended, as the Oompa-Loompas rave around the room, singing, "Vidiots". Near the end, Mrs. Teavee joins the rave, as they conclude that Mike still has a future on "mike.com". When Mike is shrunk as a result of the transporter, Mrs. Teavee happily takes him home, as he can no longer cause trouble and she can take care of him like when he was a baby. In the Broadway version of the musical, Mike hails from Iowa, and the lyrics in Mike's song and some of Mike's mannerisms reference Donald Trump.

Other characters

Arthur Slugworth

In the book, Arthur Slugworth is one of Willy Wonka's rival chocolatiers. Slugworth, along with Wonka's other rivals Mr. Fickelgruber and Mr. Prodnose, sent in spies to steal the secret recipes to Wonka's treats where they manufactured their versions of it (in his case, he made candy balloons that could be blown to large sizes), nearly ruining Wonka's factory. After Wonka re-opens his factory (operated exclusively by the Oompa-Loompas), Slugworth is never heard from again, but it is stated that Fickelgruber would give each of his front teeth to enter Wonka's inventing room (laboratory/chocolate room in the book) for three minutes. In the 1971 movie, Willy Wonka states that Slugworth would give his false teeth to get in for just five minutes.

Slugworth has a much larger role as an enigmatic villain in the 1971 film. Inside Bill's Candy Shop, Wonka's products and signs are the most visible; but Slugworth's Sizzlers are also prominent, and one is even sold to a child. Also seen are signs for Fickelgruber's candy. Grandpa Joe describes Slugworth as the worst of Wonka's rivals. As each Golden Ticket is found, a sinister man approaches the finder and whispers something into his or her ear. After Charlie finds the last ticket, the same man approaches Charlie as well, introduces himself as Arthur Slugworth, and offers the child a bribe to bring him one piece of the newly invented 'Everlasting Gobstopper', allowing him to copy the formula and prevent the future invention from ruining his business. Two of the children (Veruca and Mike) respond to Slugworth's bribe; but Charlie, when tempted, returns the Everlasting Gobstopper to Wonka. Wonka eventually reveals that the tempter is not Slugworth, but his own employee Mr. Wilkinson, and that his offer was a moral test of character. Slugworth/Wilkinson was played by Günter Meisner, a West German actor, while his speaking voice is provided by an uncredited Walker Edmiston.

Slugworth only makes a split-second appearance in the 2005 film where he, alongside Mr. Ficklegruber and Mr. Prodnose, are sending spies to steal ingredients from Wonka's factory just like in the book. He is here played by Philip Philmar in a scene where one of his spies meets up with him after work and gives him a copy of an ingredient.

In the Tom and Jerry version of the 1971 film, Slugworth is the main antagonist instead of an enigmatic villain. When he first meets Charlie, he sings a cover of Veruca's song "I Want it Now!" and also sings it as a duet with Veruca during her downfall. He teams up with Spike to steal a Gobstopper from the factory, but the two are thwarted by Charlie, Tom, and Jerry. Despite being more emphasised as a villain, he is still revealed to be Wonka's employee Mr. Wilkinson, much to Tom and Jerry's dismay. Nevertheless, the cat and mouse get the last word on Slugworth/Wilkinson and Spike by shrinking them with the Wonkavision.

Prince Pondicherry

Prince Pondicherry is a prince who lives in India. He appears in the third chapter of the novel when Grandpa Joe is telling Charlie a story. In the story, Willy Wonka makes him a chocolate palace in India, and advises him to eat it before it melts. He does not take this advice, insisting that he intends to live in the palace, which later melts in the heat from the sun. His name derives from the city of Pondicherry (officially spelled Puducherry since 2006) in southeastern India.

He is absent from the 1971 film version, but makes a brief appearance in Tim Burton's Charlie and the Chocolate Factory, where he is played by Nitin Ganatra. His story here matches that in the book, except in depicting his wife (portrayed by Shelley Conn). After his chocolate palace melted, the Prince wrote a letter to Wonka demanding a second chocolate palace that won't melt. He did not receive one due to Wonka dealing with problems of his own at the time when his rivals were sending spies to infiltrate his work force and get a copy of the specific ingredients.

In the 2013 musical, he drowns in the melted chocolate from his palace, along with his wife.

The Oompa-Loompas 
The Oompa-Loompas (also written as Oompa Loompas) are small humans who were preyed upon by the various predators that reside in their homeland before Wonka invited them to work at his factory. They are paid in their favourite food, cocoa beans, which were extremely rare on their island. The Oompa-Loompas are mischievous, loving to play practical jokes and singing songs which, according to Wonka, they are very good at improvising. They sing a song at the end of each child's comeuppance.

In early editions of the novel, the Oompa-Loompas (originally called "Whipple-Scrumpets" before publication) are shown as black African pygmies. In the 1971 film Willy Wonka & the Chocolate Factory they were written to be played by actors with dwarfism and are portrayed as orange-skinned, green-haired men in striped shirts and baggy lederhosen-like pants following criticism from the National Association for the Advancement of Colored People that the importation of African Oompa-Loompas into the factory had overtones of slavery. Following the film's release, Dahl defended himself against accusations of racism but found himself sympathising with the NAACP's comments. In 1973, Dahl rewrote them to be white-skinned.

In both editions, despite working in the factory, the Oompa-Loompas insist on maintaining their native clothing: men wear animal skins, women wear leaves, and children wear nothing.

In the 1971 film, they were portrayed by Rudy Borgstaller, George Claydon, Malcolm Dixon, Rusty Goffe, Ismed Hassan, Norman McGlen, Angelo Muscat, Pepe Poupee, Marcus Powell, Albert Wilkinson.

In the 2005 film, the Oompa-Loompas are all played by Deep Roy and are virtually identical. They wear their tribal clothing during their time in Loompaland, and typical factory worker uniforms in Wonka's factory. Some of the female Oompa-Loompas, like Doris, work in the administration offices. In the reboot, Willy Wonka explained to the visitors how the Oompa-Loompas were hired to work in the factory and Wonka even visits Loompaland in a flashback sequence.

The Vermicious Knids
The Vermicious Knids are a fictional species of amorphous aliens that invade the "Space Hotel USA" in Roald Dahl's Charlie and the Great Glass Elevator.

They are also mentioned in the 1971 feature film adaptation, Willy Wonka & the Chocolate Factory, but only as predators of the Oompa-Loompas.

In the book, Vermicious Knids are huge, dark, egg-shaped predators who swallow their victims whole, and are capable of surviving in the vacuum of space. Although normally oviform, they can assume any shape at will, while retaining their native texture and features. They originate (according to Mr. Wonka) on the planet Vermes, a fictional planet located (in dialogue)  from Earth (52 times Pluto's distance). In the presence of victims, they cannot resist shaping themselves to spell out the word "SCRAM" (the only Earth word that they know) before they attack. They are stated to be extremely voracious, having devoured an entire race that once lived on the Moon and they only avoid Earth because entering the atmosphere causes them to burn up via atmospheric friction.

In Charlie and the Great Glass Elevator, a swarm of Knids take possession of the new "Space Hotel USA". When the transport capsule brings the staff to the Space Hotel, the Knids consume some of the staff, and the survivors retreat to the capsule. There, the Knids bludgeon the capsule with their own bodies, until its retrorockets are useless; whereupon Wonka, Charlie, and Grandpa Joe connect the capsule to the Elevator, in hope of towing it to Earth, and one Knid wraps itself around the Elevator while the others form a chain, intending to draw the Elevator and the capsule to their home planet. The Elevator then returns to Earth, and the Knids are incinerated in Earth's atmosphere.

When Nestlé created its interpretation of Wonka's world to sell chocolate bars under the name "Wonka", they released a number of downloadable flash games, wherein Knids seemed to have entered the factory and had the appearance of flying green blobs with single red eyes.

The etymology of the name was not provided by Dahl. Pronunciation of Knid is said in the book to approximate adding a schwa between the "K" and "nid", or in Dahl's words, "K'nid". Cnidaria is the name of the taxonomic phylum containing stinging aquatic invertebrates such as jellyfish and corals, in turn derived from the classical Greek word for nettle, κνίδη. Vermicious is a real word, meaning "worm-like".

The Vermicious Knids are also mentioned in other Dahl stories, including James and the Giant Peach (where the New York City Police Department misidentify Miss Spider as one) and The Minpins.

Introduced in different adaptations

Mr. Turkentine

Mr. Turkentine is Charlie Bucket's school teacher and appears in the 1971 film, but not in the book or the 2005 film. He has an odd sense of humour, which he uses to express knowledge. He asks Charlie to assist him in making a medicine using several scientific elements for the class, but the project is interrupted due to the frantic Golden Ticket search for Willy Wonka. Mr. Turkentine, when hearing the news about the Golden Tickets during the project, dismisses the class and runs out. Later, when it is revealed that all of the tickets have supposedly been found ending with a Paraguayan millionaire, he decides to use Wonka bars as an example to teach his class about percentages. He uses a few students as examples for the class, including Charlie. Charlie, however, reveals that he only opened two Wonka bars during the search and so, to help make it easier for his class, he decides to pretend that Charlie opened 200.

Mr. Turkentine is played by British actor David Battley.

Dr. Wilbur Wonka

Dr. Wilbur Wonka, D.D.S. is the father of Willy Wonka in the 2005 film adaptation.

Wilbur was the town's prized dentist. While Willy Wonka was a child, Dr. Wonka imposed strict rules, putting Willy in cramped braces and forbidding Willy from ever eating candy. When Willy announced that he wanted to become a chocolatier, Dr. Wonka allowed him to leave and stated that he won't be here when Willy returns. Coincidentally, Dr. Wonka's building was later found no longer in its usual spot.

Decades later, the elder Wonka is even revealed to have collected newspaper clippings documenting his son's success when his building was found by Charlie and Willy somewhere in the arctic. When Dr. Wonka examines his son, he recognizes him and they reconcile.

Dr. Wonka is portrayed by Christopher Lee.

References

Characters
Characters
Lists of literary characters